This is a list of provincial parks in Northern Ontario. These provincial parks are maintained by Ontario Parks. For a list of other provincial parks in Ontario, see the List of provincial parks in Ontario.

Algoma District

Cochrane District

Kenora District

Greater Sudbury

Manitoulin District

Nipissing District

Parry Sound District

Rainy River District

Sudbury District

Thunder Bay District

Timiskaming District 

Ontario
Provincial parks, Northern Ontario
Provincial parks in Canada
Northern Ontario